The CRH1 EMU, also known as Hexie (simplified Chinese: 和谐号; traditional Chinese: 和諧號; pinyin: Héxié Hào; literally: "Harmony") is a high-speed train operated by China Railway and built by a joint venture between Bombardier Transportation and Sifang at Bombardier Sifang Power Transportation factory in Qingdao, Shandong Province, People's Republic of China.

At the same time as ordering the Shinkansen-based CRH2A and the Pendolino-based CRH5A, the Chinese Ministry of Railways ordered Bombardier-based CRH1, specifically 20 CRH1A trainsets in June 2007 and an additional 20 CRH1A trains, each with eight cars that have total standard capacity of 670 people. The total value of the order is €560 million. In July 2010, a further 40 CRH1A eight-car trains were ordered.

Variants

CRH1A
CRH1A and CRH1B are based on Bombardier's Regina family. The train was designed by Sifang and Bombardier jointly in Västerås, Sweden and originally named C2008.

Each CRH1A set consists of eight cars, the first batch (CRH1-001A~CRH1-040A) including two first class coaches (ZY), 5 second class coaches (ZE) and 1 second class coach/dining car (ZEC).the second batch (CRH1-081A~CRH1-120A) including two first class coaches (ZY), one first class/second class coaches (ZYE), four second class coaches (ZE) and 1 second class coach/dining car (ZEC).

The first units (CRH1-001A) were delivered on August 30, 2006, the CRH1A sets started service from February 1, 2007 at the Guangzhou -Shenzhen Railway. The 2 problems of this train is that this train is made out of stainless steel, so when the train go through tunnels, the passenger with have some ear sensitivity. This train had been given a nickname, big metro. The seats can't turn around, so half of the passengers have backward seats. The only good thing is that having fixed chairs with have more space, so CRH1A has can carry the most people.

From July 1, 2014, all CRH series EMU numbers have been changed. The original number is (CRH1—xxxA), and now it is changed to (CRH1A-1xxx). Production EMUs after that date are in accordance with the new regulations.

CRH1A-A

In September 2012, The MOR issued a revision in the Zefiro contract, which calls for the order of an additional 106 eight car Zefiro 250 (46 sets) and Zefiro 250NG (60 sets) train sets in lieu of the cancellation of the 16 car Zefiro 380 sets. The NG variant is a new model, which will use new materials in order to achieve weight reductions and more efficient operation.

CRH1B
On October 31, 2007, the Chinese MOR ordered 20 sets of CRH1B trains (CRH1-041B～CRH1-060B). CRH1B is a fleet-extended CRH1A. Each CRH1B consists of 16 cars, including three first class coaches (ZY), 12 second class coaches (ZE) and one dining car (CA). CRH1B, however, have not such restriction on the operational speed, the maximum speed is still . CRH1B first come into commercial use on April, 2009, between Shanghai–Nanjing & Shanghai–Hangzhou.

On July 23, 2011, CRH1-046B was hit on ZY104600 car by CRH2-139E in Yongtaiwen PFL accident.

CRH1E

On October 31, 2007, the Chinese MOR ordered 20 sets of CRH1E trains (CRH1-061E～CRH1-080E). The CRH1E is the first high-speed 16-car sleeper train (10M6T) in the world which is based on Bombardier's ZEFIRO  design. The train was designed by Bombardier and Zagato. Each train set from the first 12 trainsets consists of one luxury sleeper (WG), 12 soft sleepers (WR), two second class coaches (ZE) and one dining car (CA). The first CRH1E trainset delivered at October 2009, first come into service on November 4, 2009 between Beijing–Shanghai. In fact, only 15 CRH1Es were delivered, three of which having the luxury sleeper replaced with normal sleepers. The other five ended up being CRH1Bs, this time based on the CRH1E design (instead of CRH1A). Later on five additional CRH1Es (based on the CRH1A-A design) have also been manufactured and delivered.

CRH380D

The CRH380D is also derived from the Bombardier Zefiro family (Zefiro 380) of very high speed EMUs and are not direct derivatives of the Regina type trains from which the CRH1A and CRH1B classes are derived. This is the only high speed rail that doesn't have a 16 car version without connecting 2 trains into 1. The eight-car version is designated CRH380D, series number CRH380D-1501 ～ CRH380D-1585.

Formation                                                                        

Power Destination
 M – Motor car
 T – Trailer car
 C – Driver cabin
 P – Pantograph

Coach Type
 ZY – First Class Coach
 ZE – Second Class Coach
 ZYE – First Class／Second Class Coach
 ZEC – Second Class Coach／Dining Car
 ZYT – First Class／Premier Coach
 ZET – Second Class／Premier Coach
 ZYS – First Class／Business Coach
 ZES – Second Class／Business Coach
 WR – Soft Sleeper Car
 WRC – Soft Sleeper / Dining Car
 WG – Luxury Sleeper Car

CRH1A & CRH1A–A 

  Set Nº. 1001～1021, 1167, 1168
  Set Nº. 1022～1040
  Set Nº. 1086～1090, 1094～1104, 1106～1109, 1117～1119
  Set Nº. 1081～1085, 1091～1093, 1105, 1110～1116, 1120
  Set Nº. 1121～1166
  Set Nº. 1169～1228, 1234～1260

CRH1B 

  Set Nº. 1041～1060
  Set Nº. 1076～1080

CRH1E 

  Set Nº. 1061～1072
  Set Nº. 1073～1075
  Set Nº. 1229～1233 (This model is based on the CRH1A-A and sometimes informally called "CRH1E-NG" or "CRH1E-250".)

CRH380D 

  Set Nº. 1501～1510
  Set Nº. 1511～1585

Distribution 
As of April 2018, 260 CRH1 series EMU and 85 CRH380D series EMU are in service.

See also

 China Railways CRH2
 China Railways CRH3
 China Railways CRH5
 China Railways CRH380A
 China Railways CRH6
 China Railways CIT Trains
 Bombardier Zefiro
 List of high speed trains

References

External links
 Zefiro 250 Specifications Sheet
 Zefiro 380 Specifications Sheet
 CRH1B Train Exterior and Interior

Electric multiple units of China
High-speed trains of China
CSR Sifang Co Ltd.
Passenger trains running at least at 200 km/h in commercial operations
Passenger trains running at least at 250 km/h in commercial operations
Bombardier Transportation multiple units
CRRC multiple units
25 kV AC multiple units